The right border of the heart (right margin of heart) is a long border on the surface of the heart, and is formed by the right atrium.
 The atrial portion is rounded and almost vertical; it is situated behind the third, fourth, and fifth right costal cartilages about 1.25 cm. from the margin of the sternum.
 The ventricular portion, thin and sharp, is named the acute margin; it is nearly horizontal, and extends from the sternal end of the sixth right coastal cartilage to the apex of the heart.

References

External links

Cardiac anatomy